Franco Rol (5 June 1908 in Turin – 18 June 1977 in Rapallo) was a racing driver from Italy.  He participated in five Formula One World Championship Grands Prix, debuting on 21 May 1950. He scored no championship points. He also participated in many non-championship Formula One events.

Complete Formula One World Championship results
(key)

References

Italian racing drivers
Italian Formula One drivers
Maserati Formula One drivers
OSCA Formula One drivers
1908 births
1977 deaths